William Senior may refer to:

William Senior (journalist) (1837–1920), Anglo-Australian journalist
William Senior (politician) (1850–1926), Australian politician
William Senior (historian) (1862–1937), English legal historian